Aster simplex may refer to:
 Aster pseudosimplex (formerly Aster simplex Chang)
 Symphyotrichum lanceolatum (formerly Aster simplex Willd.)